BattleTech Compendium is a sourcebook  published by FASA in 1990 for the table-top miniatures mecha wargame BattleTech.

Contents
BattleTech Compendium is a supplement of rules for resolution of armored combat, which compiles the key rules from BattleTech, CityTech, and AeroTech, and covers combat between battlemechs, armored vehicles, and aerospace fighters. The book includes battlemech and vehicle statistic data from BattleTech Technical Readout 2750 and 3050 and Dropships and Jumpships, as well as new designs, and it replaces the BattleTech Manual.

Publication history
FASA published the miniatures wargame BattleTech in 1984, and many supplements and sourcebooks followed. BattleTech Compendium, published in 1990, is a 144-page softcover book written by the FASA staff, with artwork by Earl Geier, James Nelson, and Mike Nielsen.

Awards
In 1991, BattleTech Compendium won the Origins Award for Best Miniatures Rules of 1990.

Reviews
GamesMaster International, Issue 7 (Feb. 1991, p.29)
GamesMaster International, Issue 9 (April 1991, p.71)
Future Wars, Issue 20 (p. 8)
Armadillo Droppings, Issue 30 (Summer/Fall 1994, p. 17)
White Wolf Inphobia #52 (February 1995, p.80)

References

BattleTech supplements
Origins Award winners